Worlds Apart is the debut album by Soleil Moon. It was co-written by Larry King and John Blasucci, and released on MFO Records in 2000.

Production
The 12 tracks were produced, co-written, and arranged by the duo of Larry King and John Blasucci. Among the studio musicians enlisted to participate in the recording sessions were the London Symphony Orchestra, session guitarist Michael Thompson, jazz musician Paul Jackson, Jr., Warren Hill on saxophone, percussionist Lenny Castro, drummer Kenny Aronoff of Lynyrd Skynyrd and the Smashing Pumpkins, and Todd Sucherman of Styx. Many others were also participants in the Larry King Orchestra. Worlds Apart was released under King's label MFO Records.

Reception
In 2000, various tracks from the album including "Willingly" and "Never Say Goodbye" charted on the Adult Contemporary Top 100.

Reviews for the album positive, Glory Daze Music saying "As far as genre's go, Soleil Moon could fit into numerous. Smooth jazz would be one. West Coast another. 80's pop is a good fit too. The production on Worlds Apart is utterly first class, there is a depth to it that disappears out of sight, the soul and emotion displayed on all the songs is a connection very few musicians (let alone a duo) can expect to achieve in a lifetime." Another review also espoused the production quality, saying "Normally, with more or less independent releases on small labels (or no label at all) it's the production that fails the most. Not here!"

About the style, Musical Discoveries stated "the band's first album blends singer Larry King's epic rock instincts with Blasucci's sleek-flavored approach. A truly unique jazz/pop style has been used by the group in a form never achieved by any other artist."

Track listing

Personnel

Instruments, production
Larry King - vocals, co-writing, production
John Blasucci - keyboards, piano, programming, co-writing
London Symphony Orchestra
Michael Thompson - guitar
Paul Jackson Jr. - guitar
Warren Hill - saxophone
Lenny Castro - percussion
Kenny Aronoff - drums
Todd Sucherman - drums
Craig Bauer - Wha Wha keyboards
Ricky Peterson - organ
Bob Lizik - bass
Richard Patterson - bass
Background vocals
Kathleen O'Brien
Pamela Rose
Phoebe Fuller
Becca Kaufman
Donna Lori
Yvonne Gage
Paul Mabin
Jeffrey Morrow

References

External links
Soleil Moon on MySpace

2000 debut albums